, also known as , was a legendary ruler of Okinawa Island. Shunten is the earliest chief in Okinawa for whom a name is known. He is said to have taken power after defeating an usurper to the throne by the name of Riyū who had overthrown the 25th king of the Tenson dynasty.

Origin

The Chūzan Seikan (1650), the first official history of the Ryūkyūan Kingdom, and Chūzan Seifu (1701) state that Shunten was the son of samurai Minamoto no Tametomo (1139–1170). Tametomo was exiled to a penal colony on Izu Ōshima following his defeat in the Hōgen Rebellion of 1156. According to the story, Tametomo then became lost at sea some time later, arrived on Okinawa, and settled down with the sister/daughter of the anji, or local chieftain, of Ōzato. Ōzato is located at the south of Okinawa Island in the present-day city of Nanjō. Shunten, according to the two histories, was the son of Tametomo and the sister/daughter of the Ōzato anji.

However, these works were based purely on previous myths and were made six centuries after the alleged events probably because of the political circumstances after the Satsuma Invasion – although still independent until the 19th century, was subordinate to the Satsuma Domain and thus intermediary to the Tokugawa shogunate. The story is inspired by political interests to connect and legitimize the relation of Japan's imperial family with Ryūkyū. In the 12th century, somekind of migration or association from the mainland Japan with the Okinawan chieftains probably happened, but as the historical and archeological-traditional evidence indicate men from the defeated Taira clan who fled Minamoto's clan vengeance, at the time of mythological-historical writing in 17th century, was mentioned Tametomo who was from the same Minamoto clan as the Tokugawa's shōguns.

During the Meiji period, the myth was considered as an official and historical fact, especially in the constructed narrative Memorandum of Japan's sovereign rights to Ryūkyū, in response to the Chinese government's protest, as an evidence which concluded the Ryukyus relationship with Japan, and for the Japanese "legitimacy" and "sovereign right" of the annexation of the Ryukyu Kingdom in 1879.

Early life and reign
Shunten was known as Sonton (尊敦) prior to becoming king. He became anji of Urasoe in 1180 at the age of 15 after gathering a base of popular support in the area. In 1187, he overthrew Riyū and established his royal seat of power at Urasoe Castle, marking the beginning of a new line of rulers. Shunten's reign was long and progressive; by legend he is said to have ruled for 51 years.

Family
 Father: Minamoto no Tametomo
 Mother: sister of Osato Aji
 Half Siblings:
 Minamoto no Yoshimi
 Minamoto no Minobu
 Minamoto no Tameyori
 Minamoto no Toyoo
 A Daughter who married Asuke Shigenaga
 Child: Shunbajunki

Death and burial
Shunten died in 1237 at the age of 71 and was succeeded by his son Shunbajunki (1237–1248). He is buried at Urasoe yōdore, and enshrined at Naminoue Shrine along with three other Okinawan kings.

The Shunten dynasty ended in the third generation when his grandson Gihon abdicated, went into exile, and was succeeded by Eiso, who established a new royal dynasty.

Notes

References
Kerr, George H. (1965). Okinawa, the History of an Island People. Rutland, Vermont: C. E. Tuttle Co. OCLC  39242121
Nussbaum, Louis-Frédéric. (2002).  Japan Encyclopedia. Cambridge: Harvard University Press. ; OCLC 48943301

1166 births
1237 deaths
Kings of Ryūkyū
Founding monarchs
13th-century Ryukyuan people